, also referred to as , or  (all onomatopoeic terms taken from the sound  make when walking), are traditional Japanese wooden sandals worn by young girls for , young women during Coming of Age Day and apprentice geisha in some regions of Japan.

In smaller , the bell is secured by the back two  knots.

The  worn by young girls and women are generally shorter, and often feature multicoloured, lacquered designs on the sides of the shoe.  worn for  celebrations may instead feature brocade fabric decorating the outside of the shoe, with a woven bamboo base (known as ) on top.

 straps can be made of any material for young women and girls, though they are typically made of brocade fabric, velvet or otherwise decorated silk or polyester silk. For apprentice geisha,  are always worn plain, with the colour worn indicating the stage of an apprentice's training: red straps are worn by new apprentices, whereas yellow straps are worn by senior apprentices at the end of their apprenticeship.

See also 

 List of items traditionally worn in Japan
 Geta
 Jandal

References

Sandals
Japanese footwear
Japanese words and phrases